Aenetus tephroptilus is a moth of the family Hepialidae. It is known from Western Australia.

References

Moths described in 1915
Hepialidae